The 2019–20 Hrvatski telekom Premijer liga was the 29th season of the HT Premijer liga, the highest professional basketball league in Croatia. The regular season started in September 2019. On 1 April 2020, the Croatian Basketball Federation canceled the season due to ongoing coronavirus pandemic.

Format
All participants in Premijer liga including teams that play ABA League joined the regular season. It will play with a triple round-robin format where the eight first qualified teams joined the playoffs, while the penultimate will be play relegation playoffs and last qualified one was relegated.

Current teams

Promotion and relegation
Teams promoted from the First League 
Dubrava Furnir
Sonik Puntamika
Teams relegated to the First League 
Bosco 
Cedevita Junior

Venues and locations

Personnel and sponsorships

Coaching changes

Regular season

League table

Results

See also
2019–20 ABA League First Division
2019–20 ABA League Second Division
2019–20 Croatian First Basketball League
2019–20 Croatian Women's Basketball League
Teams
 2019–20 GKK Šibenka season

Notes

References

External links
Official Site 
Scoresway Page
Eurobasket.com League Page

A-1 Liga seasons
Croatian
2019–20 in Croatian basketball
Hrvatski telekom Premijer liga